The Aragonese derby, is the name given to any association football match contested between SD Huesca and Real Zaragoza, the two biggest clubs in Aragon.

History
After the dissolution of UD Huesca, teams from both cities did not meet until 1978 in a Copa del Rey match, that ended with a draw at Estadio El Alcoraz. However, Real Zaragoza would eliminate Huesca in this and in their next meeting in the first round of the 1985–86 Copa del Rey.

In 2008, the relegation of Zaragoza from La Liga and the promotion of Huesca from Segunda División B allowed them to play the first Aragonese derby in Segunda División. It was played at La Romareda and ended with a 2–2 draw in a match where Zaragoza came back from a two-goal disadvantage. At El Alcoraz, Zaragoza beat the locals 1–0. Both teams would not face one another again until January 2016, again in Segunda División, in a match that ended 3–3 at La Romareda.

Huesca beat Zaragoza for the first time, on 6 November 2017, after eleven games played between them. At the end of that season, Huesca finished second and gained automatic promotion for the first time to La Liga, while Zaragoza placed just behind in third, but lost in the subsequent play-offs (to Numancia of Soria, another of their rival teams), meaning Huesca would play in the division above their regional rivals for the first time.

Head-to-head statistics

All-time results

Segunda División

Copa del Rey

See also
Real Zaragoza's other rivalries: 
CA Osasuna (an)
CD Numancia (es)

References

Football rivalries in Spain
Real Zaragoza
SD Huesca
Football in Aragon
Recurring sporting events established in 1932